The Leader of the Opposition in Ireland is a  term sometimes used to describe the politician who leads the largest party in the Parliamentary Opposition in the lower house of the Irish Parliament, Dáil Éireann. In the Dáil, the Leader of the Opposition sits on the right-hand side of the Ceann Comhairle and directly opposite the Taoiseach. The role is not an official one and is not recognised in the Irish constitution, nor in legislation.

The Leader of the Opposition is, by convention, the leader of the largest political party in the Dáil that is not in government. Opposition leaders leading a political party with five members or more have full speaking rights under Dáil standing orders; smaller parties and independent politicians are allowed to speak less often.

Historically the two largest parties have nearly always been Fianna Fáil and Fine Gael, and so the position of Leader of the Opposition has alternated between them. However, immediately following Irish secession from the UK in 1922, the leader of the Labour Party acted as Leader of the Opposition as Sinn Féin, and later Fianna Fáil, refused to take their seats in Dáil Éireann. After the 2011 general election Fine Gael became the largest party in Dáil Éireann and the Labour Party for the first time became the second largest. However, since Labour and Fine Gael entered a coalition government, the third largest party, Fianna Fáil, led the opposition in the 31st Dáil.

To date there have been 18 Opposition Leaders, 10 of whom have served terms as Taoiseach. The current Leader of the Opposition is Mary Lou McDonald of the Sinn Féin party, following the opening of the 33rd Dáil on 27 June 2020. She is the first female Irish Opposition Leader and the first to come from a party other than Fianna Fáil or Fine Gael since the Labour Party's Thomas Johnson in 1927.

Leaders of the Opposition
 Leaders who later became Taoiseach are indicated in bold.

Leaders of the 2nd Largest Party in Opposition
 Leaders who later became Tánaiste are indicated in italics.

See also
 Opposition Front Bench (Ireland)
 Politics of the Republic of Ireland
 Taoiseach

Notes

Politics of the Republic of Ireland
Dáil Éireann
Lists of political office-holders in the Republic of Ireland
Ireland
Lists of Teachtaí Dála
Ireland